The Caucasian pygmy shrew or Ukrainian shrew (Sorex volnuchini) is a species of mammal in the family Soricidae. It is found in Armenia, Azerbaijan, Georgia, Russia, Ukraine, East Azerbaijan Province in Iran, and Turkey.

References

Sorex
Taxonomy articles created by Polbot
Mammals described in 1922